Baltistics is a multidisciplinary study of the language and culture (history, literature, folklore and mythology) of the Baltic nations. Baltistics by its subject splits into Lithuanistics, Latvistics, Prussistics, etc. Special attention is paid to the language studies, especially to the reconstruction of the Proto-Baltic language, which some linguists have argued is the same as the Proto-Balto-Slavic language.
Currently there are about 30 centres of Baltistics, most of them based in Europe, the University of Vilnius considered to be the most active centre.

History 

First signs of researching and comparing of the Baltic languages – Lithuanian and Latvian – were seen in the writings of the grammar creators (Daniel Klein, Grammatica Litvanica 1653, Gotthard Friedrich Stender, Lettische Grammatik 1783). For the first time, scientifically Baltic languages were researched and compared with other Indo-European languages in the 19th century, when Franz Bopp in 1816 laid the ground for comparative linguistics. In his Vergleichende Grammatik, published in 1833, Lithuanian was included. Prussian language was researched by Georg Heinrich Ferdinand Nesselmann (Die Sprache der alten Preussen an ihren Ueberresten erlaeutert, 1845) and Erich Berneker (Die preussische Sprache, 1896). It was Nesselmann who first suggested the term "Baltic languages".

From 1718 to 1944, a seminar for the study of the Lithuanian language took place in the University of Königsberg.

Notable Balticists 

Franz Bopp, Christian Schweigaard Stang, Rasmus Rask, Vilhelm Thomsen, Georg Nesselmann, Kazimieras Jaunius, Kazimieras Būga, Jonas Kazlauskas, Vytautas Mažiulis, Zigmas Zinkevičius, Aleksandras Vanagas, August Schleicher, Ernst Fraenkel, Jurgis Gerulis, Vladimir Toporov, Michel Jonval, Jan Otrębski, Marija Gimbutas, Jānis Endzelīns

See also 
 Slavic studies
 Indo-European studies

References

Further reading 
 The journal Baltistica, published by the University of Vilnius. 
 Gimbutas, Marija (1963). The Balts. London : Thames and Hudson, Ancient peoples and places 33.
 Compiler Adomas Butrimas (2009). „Baltų menas / Art of the Balts“. Vilnius : Vilniaus dailės akademijos leidykla.

External links 
 Baltic languages | Britannica.com

Ethnography
European folklore
European studies
Linguistics